Jordanita cirtana is a moth of the family Zygaenidae first described by Hippolyte Lucas in 1849. It is found in northern Algeria and Tunisia.

The length of the forewings is 8–10 mm for males and 7–10 mm for females. Adults are on wing from May to June.

References

C. M. Naumann, W. G. Tremewan: The Western Palaearctic Zygaenidae. Apollo Books, Stenstrup 1999,

External links

Procridinae
Moths described in 1849